Walter "Walt" "Reds" William Herrell (February 19, 1889 – January 29, 1949) was an American professional baseball player who played in one game for the Washington Senators during the  season.

Herrell began his career with the Johnson City Soldiers of the Appalachian League in 1911. He appeared in only one major league game in his career with against the Chicago White Sox in June of that year. He pitched the last two innings to finish the game and allowed the last four runs of the 18 total scored on five hits. After his major league appearance, he continued to play in the minor leagues. His last professional season was with the Waynesboro Villagers of the Blue Ridge League in 1924.

He was born in Baltimore, Maryland and died in Front Royal, Virginia at the age of 59. He was buried at Cedar Hill Cemetery in Suitland, Maryland.

References

 Baseball Reference minor league statistics

1889 births
1949 deaths
Baseball players from Baltimore
Burials in Maryland
Gettysburg Patriots players
Hagerstown Blues players
Hagerstown Champs players
Hagerstown Terriers players
Hanover Raiders players
Johnson City Soldiers players
Major League Baseball pitchers
Martinsburg Mountaineers players
Washington Senators (1901–1960) players
Waynesboro Red Birds players
Waynesboro Villagers players